Bomb (stylized in all caps as BOMB) is an American arts magazine edited by artists and writers, published quarterly in print and daily online. It is composed primarily of interviews between creative people working in a variety of disciplines—visual art, literature, film, music, theater, architecture, and dance. In addition to interviews, Bomb publishes reviews of literature, film, and music, as well as new poetry and fiction. Bomb is published by New Art Publications, Inc., a 501(c)(3) non-profit organization.

History
Bomb was launched in 1981 by a group of New York City-based artists, including Betsy Sussler, Sarah Charlesworth, Glenn O'Brien, Michael McClard, and Liza Béar, who sought to record and promote public conversations between artists without mediation by critics or journalists.

The name Bomb is a reference to both Wyndham Lewis' Blast and the fact that the magazine's original editors expected the publication to "bomb" after one or two issues. Shortly after its founding, Bomb formed a 501(c)(3) non-profit organization, New Art Publications, Inc., which publishes the journal.

In 2005, the Bomb offices moved from the SoHo neighborhood of New York City, New York, to Fort Greene, Brooklyn. By December 2019, Bomb had published one hundred fifty issues.

Notable contributors 
 Chris Abani
 Kathy Acker
Stan Allen
Martin Amis
 John Ashbery
 Matthew Barney
 Roberto Bolaño
 Giannina Braschi
Carlos Brillembourg
S. D. Chrostowska
Joshua Cohen
Edwidge Danticat
 Arthur C. Danto
 Lydia Davis
 Willem Dafoe
 Junot Díaz
 Geoff Dyer
Nicole Eisenmann
 Jeffrey Eugenides
 Jonathan Franzen
 Robert Gober
 Francisco Goldman
Felix Gonzalez-Torres
 Mary Heilmann
Philip Seymour Hoffman
A. M. Homes
 Gary Indiana
Jim Jarmusch
Barbara Kruger
 Rachel Kushner
Olivia Laing
 Ben Lerner
 Roy Lichtenstein
 Sam Lipsyte
 Dimitris Lyacos
 Robert Mapplethorpe
 Ben Marcus
Kerry James Marshall
Allan McCollum
 Eileen Myles
Al Pacino
Adam Phillips
Richard Prince
Francine Prose
 Claudia Rankine
Mika Rottenburg
Salman Rushdie
David Salle
Richard Serra
 Cindy Sherman
Anna Deavere Smith
Patti Smith
Quentin Tarantino
Mickalene Thomas
 Colm Tóibín
 Ryan Trecartin
Luc Tuymans
Edmund White
Caterina Verde

Archive at Columbia University
In 2004, Columbia University's Rare Book and Manuscript Library acquired Bomb's archives, including twenty-four years' worth of audio recordings, raw and edited interview transcripts, manuscripts, galleys, and assorted ephemera.

Oral History Project
Since 2014, Bomb's Oral History Project has staged one-on-one interviews with New York City-based visual artists of the African descent, conducted by curators, scholars, and cultural producers.

The Oral History Project is dedicated to collecting, developing, and preserving the stories of distinguished visual artists of the African Diaspora. The Oral History Project has organized interviews including: Wangechi Mutu by Deborah Willis, Kara Walker & Larry Walker, Edward Clark by Jack Whitten, Adger Cowans by Carrie Mae Weems, Jeanne Moutoussamy-Ashe by Kalia Brooks, Melvin Edwards by Michael Brenson, Terry Adkins by Calvin Reid, Stanley Whitney by Alteronce Gumby, Gerald Jackson by Stanley Whitney, Eldzier Cortor by Terry Carbone, Peter Bradley by Steve Cannon, Quincy Troupe & Cannon Hersey, James Little by LeRonn P. Brooks, William T. Williams by Mona Hadler, Maren Hassinger by Lowery Stokes Sims, Linda Goode Bryant by Rujeko Hockley, Janet Olivia Henry and Sana Musasama by Stephanie E. Goodalle.

See also
List of literary magazines

References

External links
 
 JSTOR archive.
Bomb: The Author Interviews published by Soho Press
Finding aid to Bomb magazine records at Columbia University. Rare Book & Manuscript Library.

American contemporary art
Literary magazines published in the United States
Quarterly magazines published in the United States
Contemporary art magazines
Magazines established in 1981
Magazines published in New York City